The Pac-12 Coast-to-Coast Challenge is an annual basketball game presented by MGM Resorts International. The challenge will be between men's Pac-12 teams and men's Big 12 teams. It will also feature a women's matchup between Pac-12 teams and Big 12 teams.

Men's Matchups

2021 Matchup

2022 Matchup

Women's Matchups

2021 Matchup

2022 Matchup

References

Big 12 Conference men's basketball
Big 12 Conference women's basketball
Pac-12 Conference men's basketball
Pac-12 Conference women's basketball
College men's basketball competitions in the United States
College women's basketball competitions in the United States
Recurring sporting events established in 2019